Marion Lake is a lake in the U.S. state of Montana.

Marion Lake is named after the daughter of Thomas Shields (who himself is the namesake to Shields Creek).

See also
List of lakes in Flathead County, Montana (M-Z)

References

Lakes of Flathead County, Montana